The 2021–22 Ukrainian Hockey League season is the 30th season of the Ukrainian Hockey Championship. Eight teams participated in the league in the start of the season.

The season was marked by a split in Ukrainian hockey - on 24 November 2021, 4 clubs, including the holding champions HC Donbass, left the league and announced the creation of the Ukrainian Hockey Super League. On November 30, FC BSFK entered the league. On January 8, Rulav Oddr also left the league, although it was announced that the club was renamed Kharkiv Berserkers. On February 24, the season was suspended as a result of the Russian invasion of Ukraine.

2021–22 racism controversy
On September 26, 2021, Kremenchuk and Ukraine national hockey team forward Andri Deniskin made a racist gesture of eating a banana in front of Jalen Smereck. Smereck, who is black, took offence to this and so did many other black players. Current and former NHL players Nazem Kadri, J.T. Brown, Anthony Duclair, Georges Laraque and Akim Aliu came to Smereck's support, along with them at the time UHL general manager Yevgeni (Eugene) Kolychev also came to his aide. On September 29, Deniskin was given a 13-game suspension with an option to void 10 games of it for the Ukrainian equivalent of US$1,870. This outraged many hockey fans, players and teams alike, and due to this Smereck stated that he wouldn't play in the UHL until Deniskin was given a heavier punishment. On September 30, 2021, the aforementioned Kolychev was fired by the league, causing more outrage online. However, he stated he will continue supporting Smereck regardless. On October 10, 2021, Smereck and Donbass agreed to a mutual termination, ending his time in the UHL.

Teams

Withdrawal of clubs from the league and creation of the Ukrainian Hockey Super League 
On 16 November 2021, the Disciplinary Committee of the Ice Hockey Federation of Ukraine suspended seven players of HC Donbass and HC Kramatorsk, who left the location of the Ukraine national team, from participation in official matches. On the same day, the creation of the Ukrainian Hockey Super League was announced, whose founding members became UHL clubs HC Donbass, HC Kramatorsk, Bilyi Bars and HC Mariupol.

On 24 November, HC Donbass and HC Kramatorsk were excluded from the Ukrainian Hockey League due to the continued participation of disqualified players in official games despite the decision of the Disciplinary Committee. On the same day, HC Mariupol and Bilyi Bars withdrew from the league.

On 8 December, the new Ukrainian Hockey Super League season started.

On 30 November, HC BSFK was announced as the fifth club. The season resumed on December 2.

On 8 January 2022, Rulav Oddr was announced to be renamed Kharkiv Berserkers. On the same day, the club announced its withdrawal from the league, and also denied the information about the renaming of the team.

Regular season

Results

References

External links 
 Ukrainian Hockey League on eliteprospects.com
 Ukrainian Hockey League on eurohockey.com

Ukrainian Hockey Championship seasons
Ukrainian Hockey Championship
Ukr
Sports events affected by the 2022 Russian invasion of Ukraine